The Saptak School of Music is a major classical music and performing arts education institution in Ahmedabad, India. Nandan Mehta established this institution and started Saptak Annual Festival of Music in 1980.

See also
 Saptak Annual Festival of Music
 Eastern fare music foundation

References

External links
 Official website

Music schools in India
Education in Ahmedabad